Kallaste is an Estonian surname. Notable people with the surname include:

Ken Kallaste (born 1988), Estonian football player
Risto Kallaste (born 1971), Estonian football player
Rudolf Kallaste (1904–1962), Estonian football player
Toomas Kallaste (born 1971), Estonian football player

Estonian-language surnames